Bibi Mubarika Yusufzai was the Empress consort of the Mughal Empire. She was the fifth wife of Emperor Babur, the founder of the Mughal Empire and the first Mughal emperor.

She is frequently mentioned in the Humayun-nama by her stepdaughter Gulbadan Begum, who calls her stepmother 'The Afghan lady' or 'Afghani Aghacha'. "Afghan" is a ethnonym referring to the Pashtun people.

Family
Bibi Mubarika was the daughter of Malik Shah Mansur, the chief of the Yusufzai tribe of Pashtuns. She was the granddaughter of Malik Sulaiman Shah, and the niece of Taus Khan.

One of her brothers named Mir Jamal accompanied Babur to India in 1525, and held high posts under Humayun and Akbar. He was given the title of Khan.

Marriage
Babur married her at Kehraj on 30 January 1519. The alliance was the sign and seal of amity between him and her tribe. An intelligent woman, Mubarika played an important role in the establishment of friendly relations between the Mughals and the Yusufzai Pashtun chiefs. Mubarika was much-loved by Babur as evidenced by the fact that she was one of the small and select party of ladies who were the first to join him in India in 1529.

Death
Bibi Mubarika lived through Humayun's reign and died early in Akbar's reign.

In popular culture
Bibi Mubarika is a character in Farzana Moon's historical novel Babur: The First Moghul in India (1977).

References

Indian female royalty
Mughal nobility
Pashtun women
Year of birth unknown
Year of death unknown
Indian queen consorts
Women of the Mughal Empire
People from Swat District
17th-century Indian women
17th-century Indian people